Tour 2007 is a live album released in 2007 by the Spanish rock band Héroes del Silencio. It was recorded during their 2007 Reunion Tour. Although their last performance, Live in Germany would be their latest release until 2021 with Héroes: Silence and Rock & Roll.

The album contains two CDs and two DVDs, autographed drum-sticks and picks, official backstage passes and a 60 cm x 40 cm poster. Fifth Hero guitarist Alan Boguslavsky was replaced in this tour by Juan Valdivia's younger brother Gonzalo Valdivia.

Reception

The album peaked at position three in the Spanish albums chart and was a top hit in the Mexican charts. AllMusic's reviewer praised the sound quality of the recording, and found that the album "serves well as a greatest-hits retrospective." The album received a Latin Grammy nomination for Best Rock Album by a Duo or Group with Vocal.

Track listing

CDs

DVDs 
Disc 1
"El Estanque"
"Deshacer El Mundo"
"Mar Adentro"
"La Carta"
"La Sirena Varada"
"Opio"
"Presentación"
"La Herida"
"Apuesta Por El Rock ´n´ Roll"
"Héroe De Leyenda"
"Con Nombre De Guerra"
"No Más Lágrimas"
"Nuestros Nombres"
"El Mar No Cesa"
"Entre Dos Tierras"
"Maldito Duende"
"Iberia Sumergida"
"Avalancha"
"Oración"
"La Chispa Adecuada"
"Tesoro"
"En Brazos De La Fiebre"

Disc 2
Vuelo Privado (Documentary)
GUATEMALA: "Agosto"
BUENOS AIRES: "Fuente Esperanza"
MONTERREY: "Flor Venenosa"
LOS ANGELES: "Bendecida"
ZARAGOZA: "Malas Intenciones"
SEVILLA: "Tumbas De Sal"
VALENCIA: "Despertar"
MEXICO DF: "Iberia Sumergida" (Easter Egg)

Personnel
 Enrique Bunbury - vocalist
 Joaquin Cardiel - Bass
 Gonzalo Valdivia - Rhythm guitar
 Juan Valdivia - Lead guitar
 Pedro Andreu - Drums

Chart performance

References

External links
 Héroes del Silencio Official Site

Héroes del Silencio albums
Spanish-language live albums
Live Rock en Español albums
2007 live albums
2007 video albums
EMI Records live albums
EMI Records video albums
Live video albums